748 Simeïsa (prov. designation:  or ) is a very large Hilda asteroid from the outermost regions of the asteroid belt, approximately  in diameter. It was discovered on 14 March 1913, by Russian astronomer Grigory Neujmin at the Simeiz Observatory on the Crimean peninsula. The dark P-type asteroid has a rotation period of 11.9 hours and a shape that is reminiscent of a tetrahedron. It was the first asteroid discovery made in Russia and named after the discovering observatory and its nearby Crimean town, Simeiz.

Orbit and classification 

Simeïsa is a member of the distant orbital Hilda group of asteroids, which stay in a 3:2 orbital resonance with the gas giant Jupiter. It is however not a member of the collisional Hilda family but a non-family asteroid of the background population when applying the hierarchical clustering method to its proper orbital elements. It orbits the Sun in the outermost asteroid belt at a distance of 3.2–4.7 AU once every 7 years and 10 months (2,864 days; semi-major axis of 3.95 AU). Its orbit has an eccentricity of 0.19 and an inclination of 2° with respect to the ecliptic. The body's observation arc begins at the Heidelberg Observatory on 19 February 1920, almost 7 years after its official discovery observation by Grigory Neujmin at Simeiz.

Naming 

This minor planet was named after the discovering Simeiz Observatory and its nearby Crimean town, Simeiz. Simeïsa was the first minor planet discovered in Russia. The  was mentioned in The Names of the Minor Planets by Paul Herget in 1955.

Physical characteristics 

In the Tholen classification, Simeïsa is a dark and primitive P-type asteroid, which are common in the outer regions of asteroid belt and among the Jupiter trojan population. In the SDSS-based taxonomy, it is an X-type asteroid.

Rotation period 

In October 2011, a rotational lightcurve of Simeïsa was obtained from photometric observations by French amateur astronomer René Roy. Lightcurve analysis gave a rotation period of  hours with a brightness variation of  magnitude. In the 1990s, Mats Dahlgren already determined a period of  hours with an amplitude of  magnitude.

Diameter and albedo 

The Collaborative Asteroid Lightcurve Link assumes an albedo of 0.0376 and derives a diameter of 102.79 kilometers based on an absolute magnitude of 9.12.

These timed observations are taken when the asteroid passes in front of a distant star.

References

External links 
 Lightcurve Database Query (LCDB), at www.minorplanet.info
 Dictionary of Minor Planet Names, Google books
 Asteroids and comets rotation curves, CdR – Geneva Observatory, Raoul Behrend
 Discovery Circumstances: Numbered Minor Planets (1)-(5000) – Minor Planet Center
 
 

000748
Discoveries by Grigory Neujmin
Named minor planets
000748
19130314